Sadashivrao Bhau Peshwa (3 August 1730 – 14 January 1761) was son of Chimaji Appa (younger brother of Bajirao I) and Rakhmabai (Pethe family) and the nephew of Baji Rao I. He was a finance minister during the reign of Maratha emperor Chhatrapati Rajaram II. He led the Maratha army at the Third Battle of Panipat.

Early life
Sadashivrao was born at Satara in a Chitpavan  Brahmin family. He was the son of Peshwa Baji Rao's brother Chimaji Appa. His mother Rakhmabai died when he was barely a month old. His father died when he was ten years old. He was cared by his grandmother Radhabai and his aunt Kashibai. He was very bright from early years. He was educated in Satara. His tutor was Ramchandra baba Shenvi. Nanasaheb (Balaji Baji Rao) stayed in Satara though he had become Peshwa.

Sadshivrao undertook his first campaign in Karnataka in 1746 because Babuji Naik of Baramati and Fateh Singh Bhonsle of Akkalkot failed in the task assigned to them. Sadshivrao left Satara on 5 December 1746 with a force of 20,000. He also joined Mahadoba Purandare and Sakharam Bapu as his political advisers. The campaign continued till May 1747 mostly in the western Karnatak region. In January 1747 he won his first battle at Ajra, south of Kolhapur. The Navab of Savnur was chastised, the fort of Bahadur Benda was reduced and chauth was levied from the region between the rivers Krishna and Tungabhadra. All together 36 parganas were captured in this campaign.

Sadashivrao's first military achievement was in 1760 in Carnatic region with Mahadjipant Purandare and Sakharam Bapu Bokil serving as advisers and commanders under him. He conquered from the Nawab of Savanur and subsequently annexed the cities of Kittur, Parasgad, Gokak, Yadwad, Bagalkot, Badami, Navalgund, Umbal, Giri, Torgal, Haliyal, Harihar and Basavapatna. He crushed the revolt of Yamaji Shivdev.

Mahadjipant Purandare was Diwan of Peshwa during that period. Sadashivrao was Diwan of Bhosale of Nagpur. After the death of Chhattrapati Shahu, Ramchandrababa Shenvi suggested to Sadashivrao to take Peshwai of Kolhapur, but Nanasaheb Peshwa opposed this idea. Mahadjipant Purandare resigned and Sadashivrao became the Diwan of Peshwa.

He successfully led the Battle of Udgir which weakened the Nizam of Hyderabad. He won the fort of Daulatabad. The news of Ahmad Shah Abdali's march towards Delhi and the subsequent death of Dattaji Scindia at the battle of Burari Ghat had arrived. Therefore, Sadashivrao was called back from Udgir to Partur where the Council of war was held. It was decided that Sadashivrao would go north to resist the Afghans.

Third Battle of Panipat (Marathas vs Afghans)

In January 1760, news reached the prime minister Nanasaheb Peshwa that Ahmad Shah Durrani better known as Ahmad Shah Abdālī had invaded and captured the Punjab region.

Abdali had formed an alliance against the Marathas with other Rohilla chieftains principally Najib-ul-Daula and the Nawab of Awadh Shuja-ud-Daula. Abdali recruited Afghans displaced by the war.

Nanasaheb Peshwa was then at the zenith of his power, having defeated the Nizam at Udgir. He chose Sadashivrao to lead the Maratha army to Delhi. Unlike Malharrao Holkar and Raghunathrao, both of whom had deep knowledge of northern India, Sadashivrao was unfamiliar with the personages and politics of the region. This was to prove costly, as he mishandled the regional kings and failed to form alliances with them. The main reason for the failure of the Marathas was that they went to war without good allies.

An army of between 55,000 was gathered and started its northward journey from Patdur (modern Partur) on 14 March 1760. It was accompanied by roughly 200,000 non-combatants including family members and a large number of pilgrims desirous of making pilgrimages to Hindu holy sites in northern India as they felt safe in the presence of the army. The Maratha forces of Holkar and Scindia joined the army on the way.

Sadashiv Rao was responsible for successfully adjusting the hit-and-run tactics used by the Maratha cavalry as these tactics were ill-suited for the western-style heavy artillery and infantry that he had learnt from the French. These changes had resulted in several victories for the army such as in Udgir. However, some of the Maratha generals (like Holkar) were not ready to adopt the new strategy completely and pointed out that the new units of artillery and infantry were not compatible with the other forces in the army and that the generals were not adequately trained on the deployment of the new units. Despite the reservations of his generals and a shortage of time and money, Bhau formed a unit consisting of 10,000 infantry and 50 artillery pieces.

Holkar and Scindia tried to persuade Bhau to strike diplomatic ties with Maharaja Surajmal Jat of Bharatpur and the Rajputs, Sikhs, Shuja-ud-Daula and Muslim leaders in north India. However, the Rajputs refused to support the Marathas citing unjust tribute from Rajputana and interference in the internal and political matters of Rajputana. Therefore, the Rajputs wanted to keep the Marathas away from at least the Rajputana. In 1748, the Marathas had interfered in succession of Jaipur kingdom trying to install the younger son as the king in place of the eldest son but the Maratha army under Malharrao Holkar had been checked by Maharaja Surajmal in 1749.

Therefore, both Holkar and Scindia knew Suraj Mal's strength and realised that an alliance with him was essential to win the coming war with Abdali. Despite the fact that Suraj Mal had killed Holkar's son in a battle, Scindia requested Suraj Mal to come to Agra to meet Sadashivrao Bhau for a greater cause though Suraj Mal did not trust Bhau. Both Holkar and Scindia gave their word of honour to Suraj Mal for his personal safety while persuading him to come to the Bhau's camp. Suraj Mal agreed to join the Maratha forces to defeat the foreign invader from Afghanistan.

Previous victories with artillery had made Bhau overconfident. Bhau was a man of strong character. He did not seek co-operation of the Jat and Rajput kings while planning for the war with Abdali but rather planned to punish them later to try to subjugate them. This led to their non-co-operation and an acute shortage of supplies. He did not heed the sound advice of Maharaja Suraj Mal, who held power around Delhi and Agra, to leave the civilians at Agra and take only soldiers to the battlefield though there was a severe shortage of food and other supplies. This proved fatal on the fateful day of the final battle as the food finished and the starved soldiers and horses could not fight properly and a desperate Bhau had to order an attack. The Jats did not support the Marathas.

The overbearing attitude of the Bhau when he met the regional kings at Agra worsened the matters. The Bhau failed to forge an alliance with the Jats though they held sway on the food supplies around Delhi. In fact, Bhau decided to arrest Maharaja Surajmal but Holkar and Scindia, who had given their word of honour to Suraj Mal while persuading him to come to the Bhau's camp, tipped off Suraj Mal at night and he left just after midnight. Bhau sent his men after him in the morning but Raja Suraj Mal and his men had reached the safety of Ballabhgarh fort by then and Bhau's men returned empty-handed.

Bhau also spurned the offer from the Sikhs for alliance though his commanders tried to persuade him. Therefore, he did not get any supplies from Punjab. Thus, inability to anticipate the food supplies of his army and inability to forge alliances was major cause of defeat in the Battle of Panipat.

The slow-moving Maratha camp finally reached Delhi on 1 August 1760, and took the city the next day in a battle in which artillery units were crucial in destroying the fortifications of Durrani's forces. However, Bhau found only a little supplies in Delhi for his forces.

The supplies from the region immediately around west and south of Delhi had dried up as Bhau had antagonised the regional rulers. The entire garrison of Durrani was killed. Durrani had earlier crossed the Yamuna river and was on its east bank. The river was swollen in flood and could not be crossed. Durrani watched helplessly from the east bank of the river and could do nothing to save his garrison and the Kunjpura fort on the west bank of the river. The Marathas achieved a rather easy victory at Kunjpura, although there was a substantial Afghan army posted there. Some of Abadali's best generals were killed. Ahmad Shah was encamped on the left bank of the Yamuna River, which was swollen by rains, and was powerless to aid the garrison.

However, the supplies that Bhau got at Kunjpura lasted only a few weeks as there was a large number of non-combatants in his camp.

The massacre of the Kunjpura garrison, within sight of the Durrani camp, exasperated Durrani to such an extent that he ordered crossing of the river at all costs. Ahmed Shah and his allies on 17 October 1760, broke up from Shahdara, marching north. Taking a calculated risk, Abdali daringly plunged into the river, followed by his bodyguards and troops. Between 23 and 25 October 1760 they were able to cross at Baghpat, (a small town midway between Delhi and Panipat on the east bank of Yamuna), as a man from the village, in exchange for money, showed Abdali a way through Yamuna, from where the river could be crossed unopposed by the Marathas who were still preoccupied with the sacking of Kunjpura.

After the Marathas failed to prevent Abdali's forces from crossing the Yamuna River, they set up defensive works in the ground near Panipat, thereby blocking his access back to Afghanistan, just as his forces blocked their access back towards Delhi. However, on the afternoon of 26 October Ahmad Shah's advance guard reached Samalkha, about halfway between Sonipat and Panipat, where they encountered the vanguard of the Marathas. A fierce skirmish ensued, in which the Afghans lost 1000 men killed and wounded but drove the Marathas back to their main body, which kept retreating slowly for several days. This led to the partial encirclement of the Maratha army. In skirmishes that followed, Govind Pant Bundele, with 10,000 light cavalry who weren't formally trained soldiers, was on a foraging mission with about 500 men to gather supplies. They were surprised by an Afghan force near Meerut, and in the ensuing fight Bundele was killed. This was followed by the loss of another 2,000 Maratha soldiers who were delivering the army's payroll from Delhi. This completed the encirclement, as Ahmad Shah had cut off the Maratha army's supply lines.

With supplies and stores dwindling, tensions rose in the Maratha camp as the mercenaries in their army were complaining about not being paid. Initially the Marathas moved in almost 150 pieces of modern long-range, French-made artillery. With a range of several kilometres, these guns were some of the best of the time. The Marathas' plan was to lure the Afghan army to confront them while they had close artillery support.

By November 1760, Durrani, managed to have 45,000 soldiers to block Maratha passage to the south towards Delhi. Durrani thereafter gradually isolated the Marathas financially and cut off their meagre supplies from their base in Delhi. This eventually turned into a two-month-long siege led by Abdali against the Marathas in the town of Panipat. During the siege both sides tried to cut off the other's supplies. At this the Afghans were considerably more effective, so that by the end of November 1760 they had cut off almost all food supplies into the besieged Maratha camp (which had about 1,00,000 non-combatants). According to all the chronicles of the time, food in the Maratha camp ran out by late December or early January and cattle died by the thousands. Reports of soldiers dying of starvation began to be heard in early January. Durrani had noted the huge number of non-combatants following Bhau's army, and ordered an attack on their camp, slaughtering large numbers of civilians and soldiers' families. The resulting casualties and refugees fleeing to the Maratha camp caused overcrowding, supply shortages and shook the morale of Bhau's army, forcing him to turn his attention to safely transporting the civilians to Pune. In January 1761, Bhausaheb faced famine and was blocked reinforcement due to Durrani's control of key transportation routes.

On 13 January 1761, the Maratha chiefs begged their commander, Sadashiv Rao Bhau, to be allowed to die in battle than perish by starvation. The next day the Marathas left their camp before dawn and marched south towards the Afghan camp in a desperate attempt to break the siege. The two armies came face-to-face around 8:00 a.m. on 14 January 1761, the Makar Sankranti day, and the battle raged until evening.

Finally the Marathas, who were on the verge of starvation, made a bold effort to break the blockade and issued forth to battle. The attack on Durrani was fierce and his wazir was found sitting on the ground eating mud and telling his fleeing soldiers that Kabul is far off. The battle was in the favour of Marathas till about 2 pm, when a stray bullet hit Vishwasrao and Durrani managed to throw in ten thousand troops who had fled the battlefield along with fresh 500 slave troops that guarded him. Bhausaheb was surrounded along with Jankoji Scindia and Ibrahim Gardi, while Malhar Rao Holkar managed to slip away. Fighting to the last man, Bhausaheb perished in battle.

Sadashivrao Bhau along with Ibrahim Khan Gardi had planned and were executing a battle strategy to pulverise the enemy formations with cannon fire and not to employ his cavalry until the Afghans were thoroughly softened up. With the Afghans now broken, he would move camp in a defensive formation towards Delhi, where they were assured supplies. But some Maratha generals overacted while some left battlefield leaving their defences open resulting in the defeat of the Marathas.

Durrani was taken unaware by the early morning attack, and decided to counter-attack during daylight. Durrani faced heavy initial losses. A stray bullet hit Vishwasrao, Bhau's nephew and heir to Nanasaheb Peshwa and he died on the spot. Bhau departed the battlefield to visit the corpse and plunged into the Afghan army, Vishwas rao's death had a devastating effect on the morale of his troops. Durrani attacked to take advantage of the confusion and weakness of Bhau's forces. Bhau counter-attacked but ultimately the army was defeated and any remaining civilians were massacred.

Death

Bhau, on seeing the demise of his beloved Vishwasrao, Bhausaheb came down from his elephant, climbed on a horse and plunged into the enemy lines, without realising the consequences. Seeing his empty howda, his troops thought that he had fallen and that they were leaderless and caused confusion. However, Bhau didn't leave the battlefield and was killed.

His headless body was found in the heap of dead bodies three days after the battle. It was identified by the Maratha Vakil who were with the camp of left Marathas with Kashiraj Pandit, the wazir of Shuja Ud Daula. Bhau's body was cremated with all rituals. The next day, his head was found, which was kept hidden by an Afghan soldier. It was cremated and the ashes taken for visarjan to Kashi (Vishwas Patil, Kashiraj Pandit bakhar).

Establishment of artillery units

While observing several battles, Bhau witnessed the effectiveness artillery and light-weight guns mounted on British ships and began incorporating artillery units in the army of Balaji Baji Rao. Bhau enlisted the services of Ibrahim Khan Gardi, who brought with him 2,500 trained soldiers and fifteen cannons. Bhau also employed European mercenaries who used to be in the employ of Tulaji Angre before his defeat. Notable among them was an engineer named Le Corbosier, who was an expert in foundry and in handling explosives. Within two years, Balaji Baji Rao's Infantry-Artillery division had 10,000 men and 56 guns.

Family

His first wife's name was Umabai. She gave birth to two sons who died as soon. Umabai died in 1750. Sadashivrao's second wife was Parvatibai. She accompanied Sadashivrao Bhau during the Battle of Panipat.
Sadashivrao is supposed to have died in the battle of Panipat. Parvatibai refused to accept that her husband was dead and did not live a widow's life. Around 1770, a person appeared in Pune claiming to be Sadashivrao. He was soon revealed as a fraud and is known as 'totayaa' (तोतया) which means an impostor.

The Sadashiv Peth area of Pune is named in his honour.

In popular culture
 In 1994 Hindi TV series The Great Maratha, Bhau's character was portrayed by Pankaj Dheer.
 In 2014 Marathi film Rama Madhav, Bhau was portrayed by Amol Kolhe.
 In 2019 Hindi film Panipat, he was portrayed by Arjun Kapoor.
 In 2019 Marathi TV series Swamini, he was portrayed by Abhishek Rahalkar.
 Sakalrajkaryadhurandhar Sadashivraobhau, book by Kaustubh Kasture in Marathi.

See also
 Bhau
 Maratha Empire
 Peshwe
 Bhat family
 Maratha emperors

References

Further reading
 Tryambak Shankar Shejwalkar, Panipat 1761 (Deccan College Monograph Series. I.), Pune (1946)
 Pramod Oak, "Peshwe gharanyacha Itihas"

External links

1730 births
1761 deaths
Peshwa dynasty